Govind Sharma (born 10 October 2002) is an Indian cricketer. He made his first-class debut for Jammu & Kashmir in the 2018–19 Ranji Trophy on 7 January 2019.

References

External links
 

2002 births
Living people
Indian cricketers
Jammu and Kashmir cricketers
Place of birth missing (living people)